1264 Letaba, provisional designation , is a carbonaceous asteroid and possible tumbler from the background population of the outer asteroid belt, approximately 70 kilometers in diameter. It was discovered on 21 April 1933, by South African astronomer Cyril Jackson at the Union Observatory in Johannesburg. The asteroid was named for the Letaba River in eastern South Africa.

Orbit and classification 

Letaba is a non-family asteroid of the main belt's background population. It orbits the Sun in the outer asteroid belt at a distance of 2.4–3.3 AU once every 4 years and 10 months (1,773 days; semi-major axis of 2.87 AU). Its orbit has an eccentricity of 0.15 and an inclination of 25° with respect to the ecliptic.

The body's observation arc begins at Johannesburg, the night before its official discovery observation.

Physical characteristics 

In the SMASS classification, Letaba is a carbonaceous C-type asteroid.

Rotation period 

Several rotational lightcurves of Letaba have been obtained from photometric observations since 2002. The best-rated lightcurve was measured by the Spanish amateur astronomer group OBAS in July 2016. It gave a longer-than average rotation period of 32.74 hours with a brightness variation of 0.28 magnitude. It might be a tumbler due to the lightcurve's inconsistent slope segments. Based on its current diameter estimate, Letaba would be the second-largest tumbler just behind the Hildian asteroid 1512 Oulu (see List of tumblers).

Diameter and albedo 

According to the surveys carried out by the Infrared Astronomical Satellite IRAS, the Japanese Akari satellite and the NEOWISE mission of NASA's Wide-field Infrared Survey Explorer, Letaba measures between 66.040 and 74.74 kilometers in diameter and its surface has an albedo between 0.0407 and 0.093.

The Collaborative Asteroid Lightcurve Link derives an albedo of 0.0462 and a diameter of 74.35 kilometers based on an absolute magnitude of 9.6.

Naming 

This minor planet was named after the Letaba River, located in eastern South Africa. The official naming citation was mentioned in The Names of the Minor Planets by Paul Herget in 1955.

References

External links 
 Asteroid Lightcurve Database (LCDB), query form (info )
 Dictionary of Minor Planet Names, Google books
 Asteroids and comets rotation curves, CdR – Observatoire de Genève, Raoul Behrend
 Discovery Circumstances: Numbered Minor Planets (1)-(5000) – Minor Planet Center
 
 

001264
Discoveries by Cyril Jackson (astronomer)
Named minor planets
001264
19330421